The 2005–2006 season saw Sparta Rotterdam returning in the Eredivisie, after the association football club from Rotterdam competed for three years in the Eerste Divisie. The team gained promotion in the previous season by winning the play-offs for promotion and relegation ("nacompetitie").

Matches

Eredivisie

Amstel Cup

Players

|}

See also
2005–06 in Dutch football

External links
RSSSF
ronaldzwiers 
Voetbal International
footballdatabase

2006
Sparta Rotterdam